Torrelaguna is a municipality in the Community of Madrid, Spain. It covers an area of 43.40 km2. , it has a population of 4,724.

History

Public transport 
Torrelaguna has three line buses. They are:

Line 197: Torrelaguna - Madrid (Plaza de Castilla)

Line 197D: Torrelaguna - El Vellón - El Molar

Line 913: Torrelaguna - El Atazar

Main sights

The parish church of La Magdalena (started in the 14th century, inaugurated in the 18th century) is one of the best examples of Gothic architecture in the community of Madrid. 

Other sights include:
Abbey of the Concepcionistas Descalzas. The chapel has  a Plateresque façade from the 16th century, attributed to Juan Gil de Hontañón.
Hermitage of Nuestra Señora de la Soledad (14th century).
Ancient market place
Palacio de Salinas, a Renaissance building.
Town Hall (1515)
Remains of the city walls.

Notable people
 Saint Isidore the Farmer, a pious agricultural laborer of the twelfth century prayed to for rain. He and his wife Maria were canonized in 1622.
 Francisco Jiménez de Cisneros (1436–1517), cardinal and statesman

References 

Municipalities in the Community of Madrid